Mind Candy can refer to:

 Mind Candy (album), album by Brian Larsen
 Mind Candy (company), the video game developer of Moshi Monsters
 Mind Candy (show), show by mentalist Wayne Hoffman
 "Mind Candy" (song), a song on the album Boom by Walker Hayes